The Dance Teacher is a 1995 Czech drama film directed by Jaromil Jireš.

Cast 
 Martin Dejdar - Richard Majer
 Jana Hlaváčová - Head nurse
 Miloš Kopecký - Grandfather of Richard
 Barbora Kodetová - Lydie
 Radek Holub - Pardus

References

External links 

1995 drama films
1995 films
Czech Lion Awards winners (films)
Czech drama films
1990s Czech-language films